Al1 (pronounce as Alone) is the fourth extended play by South Korean boy group Seventeen. It was released on May 22, 2017, by Pledis Entertainment. The album contains eight tracks, including the lead single "Don't Wanna Cry".

Background and release
On May 11, 2017, Pledis Entertainment released a video teaser on Seventeen's Instagram page in preparation for Al1. The video features member Vernon wandering around a deserted road with a compass in his hand. Over the next five days, twelve similar trailers, one for each member, were released on Seventeen's social media accounts. On May 16, 2017, they revealed the concept photos and track list of the mini-album on their Twitter and Instagram pages. In addition, they released the highlight medley and details of the album packaging, which consisted of a photobook, 2 posters, a photocard, a postcard and a sticker. On May 20, 2017, Seventeen released the first teaser for the title track, "Don't Wanna Cry", on their YouTube channel.

Promotions
On May 26, 2017, Seventeen made their comeback on MBC's Show! Music Core music program. This followed by promotions on SBS MTV's The Show, MBC Music's Show Champion, Mnet's M Countdown & KBS's Music Bank, with Seventeen collecting six wins in total.

Track listing 
choreography= Choi Youngjoon and Hoshi (Hoshi solely did the choreography for Don't Wanna Cry and Swimming Fool)

Awards and nominations

Music program awards

Release history

References 

Seventeen (South Korean band) EPs
2017 EPs
Korean-language EPs
Hybe Corporation EPs